The Tumi is the sacrificial ceremonial knife used by the Incas and pre-Inca civilizations.

Tumi may also refer to:

People
 Tumi Makgabo (born c. 1974/75), an anchor for CNN international
 Tumi Molekane (born 1981), a musician
 Tumi and the Volume, an African hip hop music ensemble that includes Tumi Molekane
 Christian Tumi (1930–2021), a cardinal, archbishop of Douala, Cameroon

Sports
 Peru national rugby union team, nicknamed Los Tumis

Places
 Binə, Khojavend, Azerbaijan, also known as Tumi

Companies
 Tumi Inc., an American luggage manufacturer
 Tumi Music, a Latin American record label

Other
 Tumi language, a Kainji language of Nigeria